The Patrick Maguire House is a historic house in Columbia, Tennessee, USA.

History
The two-storey house was completed in 1830. It was designed in the Federal architectural style. It was built for Patrick Maguire, an Irish immigrant. In 1849, President James K. Polk had dinner in this house.

Architectural significance
It has been listed on the National Register of Historic Places since December 15, 1983.

References

Houses on the National Register of Historic Places in Tennessee
Federal architecture in Tennessee
Houses completed in 1830
Houses in Columbia, Tennessee
National Register of Historic Places in Maury County, Tennessee